Permatang Pauh is a town in Central Seberang Perai District, Penang, Malaysia. There are two institutions of higher learning located in Permatang Pauh, namely a campus of Universiti Teknologi MARA (UiTM) and Politeknik Seberang Perai at Bandar Perda.

Permatang Pauh is beside the longest expressway in Malaysia, in Penang. It is located in the centre of Penang state, in the middle of the Bukit Mertajam and Kepala Batas. The Permatang Pauh highway is a flyover highway and a diamond shaped interchange. A U-turn road has been made below the north south highway to permit travellers to reach the Petron petrol station, flats and some shops here.

Permatang Pauh is also the hometown of the head of Penang, the Penang Governor since 2001. However, he now resides in Jalan Utama on Penang Island. His residence is near Karpal Singh house, named after the former member of parliament for Bukit Gelugor, Jelutong.

There are also several Chinese schools near Permatang Pauh. Those are Lay Keow and Chung Hwa. Butterworth primary school is called Chung Hwa.

The trunk road to Ipoh and Bukit Mertajam is also found here. It is located 160 kilometres from Ipoh and 10 kilometres from Bukit Mertajam, while with the expressway, it is 335 kilometres from Kuala Lumpur and 90 kilometres to Alor Star. People drive onto the Seberang Jaya highway flyover to go down to the capital after coming out of Permatang Pauh Interchange.

The Permatang Pauh highway town interchange is the fifth largest highway interchange in Penang after the Perai and Seberang Jaya interchange.

Places in Permatang Pauh
Seberang Jaya
Permatang Pasir
Taman Pauh & Taman Pauh Jaya
Permatang Janggus
Kampung Pertama
Kampung Sama Gagah

References

External links
 Dummipedia: Geography of Permatang Pauh
 Result of Malaysian General Election 2008 for Permatang Pauh

Central Seberang Perai District
Towns in Penang